It Ain't Easy (also known as Into the Storm and The Winnipeg Run) is a 1972 American film, starring Lance Henriksen, Barra Grant, and Bill Moor.

External links

1972 films
1970s adventure drama films
1972 independent films
American auto racing films
American adventure drama films
American independent films
Films set in Manitoba
Films set in Minnesota
Films shot in Minnesota
Motorsports in fiction
1972 directorial debut films
1972 drama films
1970s English-language films
1970s American films